Azamat Kaisynovich Kuliev (born March 1, 1963) is a Russian artist of Balkar origin. Kuliev was born in Nalchik, the capital of Kabardino-Balkaria, to the Balkar poet Kaisyn Kuliev and his Ingush wife Maka. His elder brother, Alim Kouliev, is a Russian-American actor living and working in Hollywood. His eldest brother, Eldar Kuliev, is a Russian film director and screenwriter. The member of Union of Arts of Russia. Kuliev has been affected by his father's surroundings of artistic masters and has started to paint since his childhood. Azamat Kouliev as a student was studying artistic schools of all periods patiently and hard. His work deeply influenced by one of the greatest painters of all time Leonardo da Vinci and other Italian Renaissance painters. The Balkarian folklore theme and poetry of his father also have a reflection in Kouliev's paintings.

Biography

After graduation from middle school in Nalchik where he was learning basic skills of art he moved to Leningrad and became a student of The State Academic Art School from which he graduated successfully in 1983. Since that he was working at The Art Foundation in Nalchik. After serving in the Soviet Army in 1986 Kuliev returned to Leningrad and studied at the Repin St. Petersburg State Academic Institute of Painting, Sculpture and Architecture, formally known and subordinated within the Russian Academy of Arts, under direction of Andrei Mylnikov,, an acclaimed Russian artist, Vice-President of Russian Academy of Arts, and graduated in 1996.

Since 1998 the artist is living and working in Turkey.

Exhibitions

Personal exhibitions

1997 – Memorial Museum of Kaisyn Kuliev
1997 – Kabardino-Balkaria Foundation of Culture, Nalchik, Russia
1999 – Aysel Gozubuyuk Sanatevi, Ankara, Turkey
2001 – Galeri Selvin, Istanbul, Turkey
2001 – Aysel Gozubuyuk Sanatevi, Ankara, Turkey
2005 – Galeri Selvin, Ankara, Turkey
2007 – Galeri Baraz, Istanbul, Turkey
2007 - Memorial Museum of Kaisyn Kuliev
2013 – Gallery Bonart, Istanbul, Turkey
2014 – Gallery Lombardi, Rome, Italy Curator: Giorgio Bertozzi, Ferdan Yusufi.
2016 – Stilllife Art Gallery, Ankara, Turkey
2018 -  Arda Art Gallery, Ankara, Turkey
Others

1997-2002 – Turksav Turk Dunyasi, Ankara, Turkey 
1998 – Region Exhibition Russian South, Krasnodar, Russia
1998 – Arts ve Crasts (Fair), Ankara, Turkey
1999 – Arts ve Crasts (Fair), Ankara, Turkey
1999 – Gallery Nefertiti, Ankara, Turkey
2000 – Museum of Arts, Nalchik, Russia
2001 – Museum of Arts, Nalchik, Russia
2002 – Ankart (Fair), Ankara, Turkey
2002 – Artistanbul (Fair), Istanbul, Turkey
2005 – Atatürk Kultur Merkezi, Istanbul, Turkey
2007 - Museum of Arts, Nalchik, Russia
2008 – Art show (Fair), Istanbul, Turkey
2011 –1. International Art Symposium, Gazi University, Ankara, Turkey
2012 – Infinity Has No Accent, Berlin, Germany, Project: Halil Altındere, Curator: René Block/Barbara Heinrich, Tanas Gallery
2013 – ON6 Young Artist Group and Teachers, Aysel Gozubuyuk Sanatevi, Ankara, Turkey
2013 – Ironias Turcas, CA2M Centro de Arte Dos de Mayo, Madrid, Spain Project: Halil Altındere
2013 –Together, Vista Gallery, Rome, Italy
2013 – A La Salida L’arte rende omaggio ad Alida Valli e Giancarlo Zagni, Gabriel Zagni, Vista Gallery, Rome, Italy Curator: Giorgio Bertozzi, Daniele Goretti, Ferdan Yusufi
2013 – Mom I am Barbarian!, Doruk Art Gallery, Istanbul, Turkey
2013 – Immagina Arte In Fiera Reggio Emilia, Neo Art Gallery, Reggio Emilia, Italy
2014 – Artexpo (Fair), New York City, United States
2015 – Artexpo (Fair), New York City, United States
2015 – Le Dame Art Gallery, USEUM, London, United Kingdom
2016 – ‘Day Dreams’, Summart Gallery, Istanbul, Turkey
2016 – ‘İmge Beden’, Summart Gallery, Istanbul, Turkey
2016 – II. Artankara Çağdaş Sanat Fuarı, Stilllife Art Gallery, Ankara, Turkey
2016 – EuroExpoArt Vernice Art Fair, Forlì, Italy
2016 – İstanbul Interior Architect Fair, Stilllife Art Gallery, Istanbul, Turkey

References

External links
Azamat Kouliev Official Web Page

1963 births
Living people
People from Nalchik
20th-century Russian painters
Russian male painters
21st-century Russian painters
20th-century Russian male artists
21st-century Russian male artists